Velisovo is a rural locality (a village) in Bogolyubovskoye Rural Settlement, Suzdalsky District, Vladimir Oblast, Russia. The population was 48 as of 2010. There are 6 streets.

Geography 
Velisovo is located 51 km southeast of Suzdal (the district's administrative centre) by road. Chirikovo is the nearest rural locality.

References 

Rural localities in Suzdalsky District